The 2019–20 División de Honor was the 53rd season of the top flight of the Spanish domestic rugby union competition since its inception in 1953.

Valladolid won its fourth consecutive title, its tenth overall, in a curtailed season.

Competition format

The División de Honor season takes place between September and March, with every team playing each other home and away for a total of 22 matches. Points are awarded according to the following:
4 points for a win
2 points for a draw
1 bonus point is awarded to a team scoring 4 tries or more in a match
1 bonus point is awarded to a team that loses a match by 7 points or fewer

The six teams with the highest number of points at the end of 22 rounds of matches play the championship playoffs. The top two teams win a semifinal berth automatically, while the next four teams play off to take the remaining two spots.

Promotion and relegation 
The second-tier División de Honor B is made up of three regional groups. The top eight teams across the three groups play off; the champion is promoted to División de Honor, at the expense of the team which finishes last in the División de Honor. The runner-up plays a further play-off against the team which finishes 11th in the top flight.

Covid-19 pandemic 
As a result of the pandemic, the season was curtailed after 17 games. Valladolid were declared champions, as they were league leaders. Hernani were relegated to División de Honor B.  

In the absence of regional playoffs, Getxo Artea RT were promoted after topping Group A of División de Honor B with 95 points. Their superior points difference saw them preferred to Jaén, who topped Group C with the same number of points.

Bathco did not have to play the relegation playoff, and remained in the top flight.

Teams

Results

Table

References

External links
Official site

Rugby union in Spain
2018-19
 
Spain